Bernardino Di Mariotto dello Stagno (Perugia, circa 1478 - Perugia, 1566)  was an Italian painter of the Renaissance period.

Biography 
He trained first under either Lodovico di Angelo Mattioli of Perugia or  Fiorenzo di Lorenzo, and later worked in the studio of Lorenzo da San Severino the Younger and of Vittore Crivelli. He was in San Severino Marche by 1502, and after Lorenzo's death in 1503 took over his workshop. He returned to Perugia in 1522, and was active there until 1541.

Gallery

References

1478 births
1566 deaths
15th-century Italian painters
Italian male painters
16th-century Italian painters
Umbrian painters
People from Perugia
Italian Renaissance painters